Jeffrey Gapari Kitingan (born 22 October 1948) is Malaysian politician. He served as the Deputy Chief Minister II of Sabah from 2020 to 2023 and State Minister of Agriculture and Fisheries since 2020 (also served in the same position for a brief period in May 2018). In January 2023, he was appointed as the Deputy Chief Minister I of Sabah succeeding Bung Mokhtar, who was dropped due to a political crisis (but retained his ministerial portfolio). 

At the federal level, he served as the Deputy Minister of Tourism, Arts and Culture from March 2020 to his resignation in September 2020 and Deputy Minister of Housing and Local Government from August 1994 to May 1995. He has served as Member of Parliament (MP) for Keningau since May 2018, Member of the Sabah State Legislative Assembly (MLA) for Tambunan since May 2018 and Bingkor from May 2013 to May 2018. He has served and been founding President of the Homeland Solidarity Party (STAR), a component party of the ruling Gabungan Rakyat Sabah (GRS) and a former component party of the federal and state ruling Perikatan Nasional (PN) coalition, since July 2016.

Background
He was born in the town of Kota Marudu but hailed from the interior district of Tambunan. He graduated with an Master of Public Administration from Harvard University's John F. Kennedy School of Government. He has a PhD awarded in 1984 from the Fletcher School of Law and Diplomacy of Tufts University.  His brother, Joseph Pairin Kitingan served as the Chief Minister of Sabah from 1985 to 1994.

Political career 
He is known to be a controversial politician, having been detained without trial under the Internal Security Act by the Barisan Nasional-controlled federal government on suspicion of plotting to secede Sabah from the federation of Malaysia, although his defenders argue that this was a politically motivated move.

He is also known to have switched political parties a number of times. In 1990, he started his political career together with his brother Joseph Pairin Kitingan in Parti Bersatu Sabah (PBS). However, after the 1994 state election, he abandoned his brother and PBS to join Angkatan Keadilan Rakyat (AKAR) party, leading to the downfall of the PBS government in Sabah. He tried to climb to the top post of the AKAR party but failed and rejoined PBS in 1996. However, in 2000, he quit PBS again and joined Parti Bersatu Rakyat Sabah (PBRS), tried to take over the party but failed again. He then quit the PBRS party in 2002 and tried to join United Pasokmomogun Kadazandusun Murut Organisation (UPKO). However, he quickly withdrew his membership application from UPKO and tried to join back PBS again for the third time, but PBS did not welcome him back into the party. In 2003, he applied to join the United Malays National Organisation (UMNO) twice: one through UMNO headquarters in Kuala Lumpur, but was rejected. He then applied another membership through UMNO Keningau branch in Sabah using his legal name "Gapari bin Kitingan @ Geoffrey Kitingan" and was mistakenly accepted by UMNO. Jeffrey was able to produce his UMNO membership card. However, once the UMNO supreme council realised their error, they immediately revoked Jeffrey's membership.

Jeffrey remained independent of any party until he was accepted into Parti Keadilan Rakyat (PKR) in 2006 where he became the vice-president of the party. He resigned his vice-president post in 2009 but remained as a party member. In December 2010, Jeffrey founded a NGO named United Borneo Alliance (UBA), which aimed to strive the rights of Sabah and Sarawak in accordance to 20-point agreement and Malaysia Agreement. He finally quit the PKR party in January 2011. In 2012, Jeffrey launched the Sabah chapter of Sarawak-based State Reform Party (STAR). in 2015, he brought his UBA into United Sabah Alliance (USA), just before he brought his Sabah chapter out of the Sarawak-based STAR to establish a Sabah-based party named Homeland Solidarity Party (STAR) in 2016.

In the 2008 general election, he challenged his brother Tan Sri Datuk Seri Panglima Joseph Pairin from BN-PBS at the Keningau parliamentary constituency, but lost. Instead he won the Sabah State Legislative constituency of Bingkor.

Jeffrey has been referred as political "frog" (katak in Malay) for his penchant of party hopping throughout his political career. Jeffrey responded by commenting that party hopping has been the common practice in Sabah politics. He defended himself that he switches parties in order to find the one that is suitable to fight for the rights of the Sabah people.

2018 state election decision maker and subsequent results 
Following the 2018 general election, the BN and the coalition of Pakatan Harapan (PH) with Sabah Heritage Party (WARISAN) are tied up with 29-29 seats in the 2018 Sabah state election. Jeffrey with his party of Homeland Solidarity Party (STAR) under the United Sabah Alliance (USA) which are not aligned from either the two sides, has won two seats in the election and subsequently emerged as the decision maker for the formation of a state government from the two sides. He then decide to team up with the BN to form coalition state government with him appointed as a Deputy Chief Minister while Musa Aman from BN continue to become the Chief Minister for another 5 years under the new coalition government. His decision to maintain the position of BN in Sabah then drew many criticism from Sabahan residents who want to see a change under the administration of a new state government with many began to labelling him as a "traitor" towards the state, especially when he was once a staunch opposition towards BN rule before the election. It is also reported that before the election, Jeffrey has been issue with 7-days bankruptcy notice. Following his sudden decision to work with BN, the Sabah branch of PKR has urged the Malaysian Anti-Corruption Commission (MACC) to probe the two individuals, citing a “possibility of money changing hands between the two” that could leading to a sudden political partnership. Following the complaint, Prime Minister Mahathir Mohamad announced that they will not recognise the election in Sabah if corruption involved. Situation also change when six seats assemblymen from the BN allied party of UPKO switched their allegiance to WARISAN, giving the Shafie Apdal party an advantage with 35 seats which sufficient to establish a valid state government. In addition, the Sabah Yang di-Pertua Negeri (TYT) Juhar Mahiruddin also had requested Musa to step down from his position, as Musa current position has contravened the Article 7(1) of the Sabah State Constitution when he lost the total majority state seats. On 14 May 2018, a letter from TYT are being delivered to Musa residence which stating that he is no longer the Chief Minister effective from 12 May 2018.

During the 2020 Malaysian political crisis, Kitingan supported Mahathir Mohamad to be reinstated as Prime Minister after his resignation.

2020 state election 
In the 2020 Sabah state election, he agreed lead his party, STAR to joined Gabungan Rakyat Sabah (GRS) against Warisan Plus. This resulted in his party winning 6 seats in the state election, Jeffrey himself won the Tambunan seat. After winning the election, he was appointed as the Deputy Chief Minister II, serving with Datuk Bung Mokhtar as Deputy Chief Minister I and Datuk Joachim Gunsalam as Deputy Chief Minister III.

On the day of his appointment as Deputy Chief Minister II, he resigned as Deputy Minister of Tourism, Arts and Culture.

Carbon credit deal 
In late 2021, Mongabay reported that Kitingan was involved in a carbon credit deal that was signed in October 2021 that declared 2 million hectares as protected areas, without the consultation of indigenous peoples residing there. Civil society groups and indigenous leaders were critical over the secrecy of the agreement and whether the carbon accrediting company, Hoch Standard, had prior experience to implement it.

Personal life
Jeffrey is currently married to Cecilia Kitingan, a fellow native of Tambunan who hailed from a village named Kampung Monsok (he was from another village known as Kampung Karanaan), whilst he is separated from his Caucasian American wife, Susan.

In January 2021, Jeffrey tested positive for COVID-19 and underwent treatment at Queen Elizabeth Hospital in Kota Kinabalu, Sabah. Both Kitingan and his wife were recovered and discharged from hospital after about two weeks later.

Election results

Honours

Honours of Malaysia
  :
  Commander of the Order of Meritorious Service (PJN) - Datuk (2021)
  :
  Commander of the Order of Kinabalu (PGDK) – Datuk (1987)
 Grand Commander of the Order of Kinabalu (SPDK) – Datuk Seri Panglima (2020)

Kadazan, Dusun, Murut & Rungus (KDMR) tribes honours
Huguan Siou Lundu Mirongod (2016) 
On 16 December 2016, Jeffrey Kitingan was given the title of Huguan Siou Lundu Mirongod  which means the brave paramount thinker of the tribe. The installation of this title was done by the keeper of the “Adat” and Traditions of the KadazanDusuns, Tindarama Bobolian Chief, OKK Ammann Sirom Simbuna OT Tarantab in Kota Belud. This is the second highest honours in the Tribe after Huguan Siou.

References

Further reading 
 Nilakrisna James, ‘Enlightened’ Jeffrey recalls ISA’s cruelty , Free Malaysia Today. 29 September 2011.
 Ian Neubauer, Very hush hush Borneo's 80bn Carbon deal stokes controversy, Al-Jazeera. 2 February 2022

Living people
1948 births
People from Sabah
Kadazan-Dusun people
Malaysian political party founders
Leaders of political parties in Malaysia
People's Justice Front politicians
Parti Bersatu Rakyat Sabah politicians
United Progressive Kinabalu Organisation politicians
United Malays National Organisation politicians
Former People's Justice Party (Malaysia) politicians
State Reform Party politicians
United Sabah Party politicians
Homeland Solidarity Party politicians
Members of the Dewan Negara
Members of the Dewan Rakyat
Members of the Sabah State Legislative Assembly
Leaders of the Opposition in the Sabah State Legislative Assembly
Harvard Kennedy School alumni
Commanders of the Order of Kinabalu
Malaysian prisoners and detainees
Prisoners and detainees of Malaysia
21st-century Malaysian politicians
Commanders of the Order of Meritorious Service